Ireti Osayemi  (born 14 January 1982) is a Nigerian Yoruba-language film actress.

Background and education 
Ireti Osayemi was born on January 14, 1982. Her parents and she had lived in Liberia before returning to Nigeria during the Liberian civil war. She is from Lagos state, where she received her entire education. Ireti went on to Ajumoni Secondary School in Lagos after finishing primary school and earning her West African Leaving Certificate.

She later attended Lagos State University in Ojo, Lagos, where she earned a Bachelor's Degree in Economics.

Career 

Ireti Osayemi entered the Nigerian film business in 1999 and began appearing in Nollywood films. She primarily appeared in Yoruba films alongside Funke Akindele, Eniola Badmus, and Odunlade Adekola.

Personal life 
Ireti Osayemi married Nollywood movie producer Bakky Adeoye in 2008, and their marriage has two children.

She had their first child in 2007 before they married, and their second child in 2009, after they married.

Awards and nominations

References 

21st-century Nigerian actresses
Nigerian film actresses
Yoruba actresses
Actresses from Lagos State
Nigerian film producers
Nigerian women film producers
Yoruba filmmakers
Actresses in Yoruba cinema
1982 births
Living people
Nigerian film award winners
Lagos State University alumni
20th-century Nigerian actresses